Oru Kudakeezhil is a 1985 Indian Malayalam-language film,  directed by Joshiy and produced by Sajan. The film stars Shankar, Madhavi and Nedumudi Venu, while Venu Nagavally, Sukumari, Thilakan and Rohini play supporting roles. The film has musical score by Johnson.

Cast

Shankar as Ravi Nair
Madhavi as Prof. Vijayalakshmi Nair
Nedumudi Venu as Venukuttan Nair
Sukumari as Bharathiyamma
Thilakan as Kurup
Venu Nagavally as Unnikrishnan 
Rohini as Sreedevi Nair
Prathapachandran
Baby Shalini as Sreedevi Nair
James as Nair
KPAC Sunny as Adv. Viswanathan Nair
Lalu Alex as CI Felix Joseph
Mala Aravindan as Pushpangathan
Paravoor Bharathan as Koshy
Thodupuzha Vasanthi as Saraswathi Nair

Soundtrack
The music was composed by Johnson with lyrics by Poovachal Khader.

References

External links
 

1985 films
1980s Malayalam-language films
Films directed by Joshiy